The 1985–86 European Cup Winners' Cup was won by Dynamo Kyiv in the final against Atlético Madrid. It was their second title in the competition, and first since 1975.

Reigning champions Everton, who initially qualified for the European Cup instead as the 1984–85 Football League champions, and 1985 FA Cup winners Manchester United missed out on European football due to the newly enacted five-year ban on English clubs participating in Europe, following the Heysel Stadium disaster on 29 May 1985.

CSKA Sofia were barred from entering after the riots during the Bulgarian Cup final.

First round

|}

First leg

Second leg

Dynamo Kyiv won 6–3 on aggregate.

Second round

|}

First leg

Second leg

Dynamo Kyiv won 5–2 on aggregate.

Quarter-finals

|}

First leg

Second leg

Dynamo Kyiv won 9–2 on aggregate.

Semi-finals

|}

First leg

Second leg

Dynamo Kyiv won 4–1 on aggregate.

Final

Top scorers

See also
1985–86 European Cup
1985–86 UEFA Cup

External links
 1985–86 competition at UEFA website
 Cup Winners' Cup results at Rec.Sport.Soccer Statistics Foundation
  Cup Winners Cup Seasons 1985-86–results, protocols

3
UEFA Cup Winners' Cup seasons